The Research Organization for Earth Sciences and Maritime (ORIPKM) is one of Research Organizations under the umbrella of the National Research and Innovation Agency (BRIN). It was founded on 1 September 2021 as Research Organization for Earth Sciences (ORIPK), transformation of Deputy I (Earth Sciences) of Indonesian Institute of Sciences (LIPI) after the liquidation of LIPI into BRIN.

On 24 January 2022, it is announced that the organization extended with fusion of elements from Geospatial Information Agency, Meteorology, Climatology, and Geophysical Agency, Ministry of Marine Affairs and Fisheries, Aeronautics and Space Research Organization-LAPAN. The fusion expected to turn ORIPK to ORIPKM officially on 1 February 2022. ORIPKM formation is finalized on 1 March 2022 and is functional since 4 March 2022.

History 
Founded on 1 September 2021 as ORIPK, ORIPK was transformation of Deputy I (Earth Sciences) of LIPI after the liquidation of LIPI into BRIN. As research organizations of BRIN, as outlined in Article 175 and Article 176 of Chief of BRIN Decree No. 1/2021, every Research Organizations under BRIN are responsible and answered to Chief of BRIN. It also prescribed that the Research Organizations consisted with Head of Research Organizations, Centers, and Laboratories/Study Groups. For the transitional period, as in Article 210 of Chief of BRIN Decree No. 1/2021 mandated, the structure of ORIPK follows the preceding structure that already established during its time in LIPI. Due to this, the structure of ORIPK follows the Chief of LIPI Decree No. 24/2020. On 22 September 2021, ORIPK constituting document, Chief of BRIN Decree No. 9/2021, signed by Laksana Tri Handoko and fully published on 8 October 2021.

On 24 January 2022, it is announced that the organization extended with fusion of elements from Geospatial Information Agency, Meteorology, Climatology, and Geophysical Agency, Ministry of Marine Affairs and Fisheries, Aeronautics and Space Research Organization-LAPAN. The fusion turned ORIPK to ORIPKM officially on 1 February 2022. The organization name officially become ORIPKM thru Chairman of BRIN Decree No. 8/2022, backdated from 25 February 2022.

On 4 March 2022, ORIPKM is fully functional with inauguration of its first head, Ocky Karna Rajasa.

Structure 
The structure of ORIPKM is as follows:

 Office of the Head of ORIPKM
 Research Center for Geospatial
 Research Center for Geological Disaster
 Research Center for Climate and Atmosphere
 Research Center for Limnology and Water Resources
 Research Center for Geological Resources
 Research Center for Oceanography
 Research Center for Deep Sea
 Research Center for Marine and Land Bioindustry
 Research Center for Fishery
 Research Center for Conservation of Marine and Inland Water Resources
 Research Groups

List of Heads

References 

Science and technology in Indonesia
2021 establishments in Indonesia
Research institutes in Indonesia
National Research and Innovation Agency